2018 Lombok earthquake may refer to the following 5 thrust type earthquakes, with epicentres north of Rinjani volcano, that caused significant damage and deaths:

July 2018 Lombok earthquake ( and : 6.4, a foreshock)
5 August 2018 Lombok earthquake (Mw: 6.9, : 7.0, the mainshock)
9 August 2018 (: 5.9 aftershock, 6 deaths)
18 August 2018 23:10pm local time Lombok earthquakes (: 6.4 aftershock, 2 dead) 
19 August 2018 Lombok earthquake ( 6.9 new earthquake, different fault.)

See also
 2018 Indonesia earthquakes
 List of earthquakes in Indonesia, including Lombok
 List of earthquakes in 2018

 2018 disasters in Indonesia
 2018 earthquakes
 Lombok